Wolfgang Stahl (1 April 1956 in Kiel – 28 August 2020 in Aachen) was a German spectroscopist. He was a professor at the RWTH Aachen University.

Life 
Wolfgang Stahl finished his diploma in chemistry at the University of Kiel in 1983. He received his doctorate in 1987 at the University of Kiel. In 1992, he finished his habilitation in physical chemistry at the University of Kiel. Since 1995, he was professor for molecular spectroscopy at the RWTH Aachen University. For many years he was chairman of the examination board for chemistry and person in charge for the Erasmus Programme in chemistry.

Research 
His research focused on following topics in the field of microwave spectroscopy:
 Large amplitude motions in molecules
 Theory of rotational spectra
 Quantum mechanical and group theoretical calculation
 Nuclear quadrupole coupling

Publications (selection)
He published 149 journal articles. A selected number of his articles for different topics:

Instrumental work for Fourier transform microwave (FTMW) spectroscopy

Naturally occurring substances and fragrances

Nuclear quadrupole coupling constants

References 

University of Kiel alumni
Academic staff of RWTH Aachen University
1956 births
2020 deaths
Spectroscopists